A Sector clock or colour change clock was a round colour-coded clock used at military airfields and observation posts in the United Kingdom to help track the movements of enemy aircraft and control friendly aircraft.

History 
Originally known as "colour change clocks", they were introduced during the First World War by the Royal Flying Corps in 1917 to monitor the movements of German aircraft. Later, during the Second World War they played a significant role in the Battle of Britain and continued to be used by the Royal Air Force and Royal Observer Corps (ROC) as simple clocks and keepsakes, until the end of the Cold War period. These clocks are now sought after by collectors of aeronautica.

There were two versions of the clock issued, either for RAF Sector use or for the ROC. The RAF Sector Clock  has an old style "King's Crown" RAF Warrant Officer's insignia under the "24" at top centre. The ROC clock has a plain face with no insignia.

Clocks were either electrical or mechanical. Electric clocks usually have the coloured segments pointing inwards, mechanical clocks have the segments pointing outwards.

The United States Army Air Force (USAAF) also adopted the RAF sector clock with a coloured block pattern rather than triangles.

Function 

The Sector Clock was a fundamental part of Ground-controlled interception (GCI) before modern computerized systems were put in place for airspace control. The clock face is marked with five-minute red, yellow and blue triangular segments. It has an outer 12-hour ring and an inner 24-hour dial.

Aircraft position was recorded along with the colour of the triangle beneath the minute hand at the time of sighting.  This was reported to sector headquarters, where counters of the relayed colour were used to represent each air raid on a large table with a map of the UK overlaid with a British Modified Grid.  As the plots of the raiding aircraft moved, the counters were pushed across the map by magnetic "rakes". This system enabled "Fighter Controllers" to see very quickly where each formation was heading and allowed an estimate to be made of possible targets.  The age of the information was readily apparent from the colour of the counter.  Because of the simplicity of the system, decisions could be made quickly and easily.

See also
 Battle of Britain Bunker
 Dowding system

References

Clock designs
Battle of Britain
World War II military equipment of the United Kingdom
Military aviation